Combate Global  (previously Combate Americas) is an American mixed martial arts (MMA) sports franchise and media company directed toward a Hispanic audience. It includes TV broadcasts, live events, and mobile content

Combate Global airs on Univision, Televisa, TUDN, CBS Sports Network and Paramount Plus. 

Combate Global caters to a millennial audience.  The average age of the viewer is 27.

Leadership 

Campbell McLaren is the CEO and Founder of Combate Global. He is the co-founder/co-creator of the Ultimate Fighting Championship (UFC). 

Joe Plumeri is the non-Executive Chairman of the board. Plumeri has served as the CEO of Citibank North America, Chairman and CEO of Primerica, Co-Managing Partner or Shearson Lehman Brothers, and the Chairman and CEO of Willis Group Holdings. He is the Co-owner of the New York Yankees minor league affiliate team, the Trenton Thunder.

History

Beginnings and reality show 
Combate Global began as a reality show (called Combate Americas) on Mun2, featuring ten fighters in two weight classes competing for a chance to win an exclusive contract with Combate Global. The series culminated in a set of fights, with Ismael Leon being crowned the featherweight champion and Danny Morales winning the welterweight bracket.

Chino y Nacho hosted the series, while Daddy Yankee served as the first commissioner of Combate Global.

McLaren, the CEO of Combate Global, claims that the company “was specifically created to present the best new Hispanic fighters and to introduce a whole new audience to this highly entertaining sport.”

Rebranding and television deals
In late March 2021, Combate Americas announced that due to rebranding the organization it is now named as Combate Global. Simultaneously, they announced a five-year broadcasting partnership with Univision and a plan to produce 150 televised events. After increased ratings, news surfaced in late July 2021 that Univision had bought a significant equity stake in Combate Global.

In late June 2021, Combate Global announced that CBS Sports, through CBS Sports Network and Paramount Plus, would become the English language home for Combate Global.

List of events 

Combate Americas: Level vs. Arzeno

December 12, 2013 - Magic City Casino, Miami, Florida, United States

Main Event: Rene Martinez vs. Alan Arzeno

Combate Americas: Alvarez vs Patterson

September 17, 2015 - The D Casino, Las Vegas, Nevada, United States

Main Event: Gustavo Lopez vs. Mauricio Diaz

Combate Americas: Hollywood

December 16, 2015 - Florentine Gardens, Hollywood, California, United States

Main Event: John Castañeda vs. Federico Lopez 

Combate 5

April 18, 2016 - The Exchange, Los Angeles, California, USA

Main Event: Erick Sanchez vs. Mike Segura

Combate 6

April 26, 2016 - The Exchange, Los Angeles, California, United States

Main Event: John Castaneda vs. Gabriel Solorio

Combate 7

May 9, 2016 - The Exchange, Los Angeles, California, United States

Main Event: Ricky Palacios vs. Brandon Royval

Combate 8

August 11, 2016 - The Exchange, Los Angeles, California, United States

Main Event: John Castaneda vs. Angel Cruz

Combate 9: Empire Rising

October 14, 2016 - Turning Stone Resort Casino, Verona, New York, United States

Main Event: John Castaneda vs. Gustavo Lopez

Combate 10

January 19, 2017 - El Plaza Condesa, Mexico City, Federal District, Mexico

Main Event: Gustavo Lopez vs. Steve Swanson

Combate 11

February 16, 2017 - Burbank, California, United States

Main Event: Danny Ramirez vs. Erick Gonzalez

Combate 12

March 30, 2017 - Fausto Gutierrez Moreno Municipal Auditorium, Tijuana, Baja California, Mexico

Main Event: Marcelo Rojo vs. Ivan Hernandez Flores

Combate 13

April 20, 2017 - Casino Del Sol Resort, Tucson, Arizona, United States

Main Event: Ricky Palacios vs. Roman Salazar

Combate 14

May 5, 2017 - Ventura County Fairgrounds, Ventura, California, United States

Main Event: Emilio Chavez vs. Jose Estrada

Combate 15

June 30, 2017 - Sala De Armas, Mexico City, Federal District, Mexico

Main Event: Rodrigo Vargas vs. Danny Ramirez

Combate 16: Combate Clásico

July 27, 2017 - Mana Wynwood Convention Center, Miami, Florida, United States

Main Event: Ricky Palacios vs. Chris Avila

Combate 17: El Grito En La Jaula

September 15, 2017 - Splash Kingdom Amphitheater, Redlands, California, United States

Main Event: Jose Estrada vs. Izic Fernandez

Combate 18: Copa Combate

November 11, 2017 - Grand Oasis Cancún, Quintana Roo, México

Copa Combate Tournament

Extra Fights 

Combate 19: Queen Warriors

December 1, 2017 - Freeman Coliseum, San Antonio, Texas, United States

Main Event: Kyra Batara vs. Paulina Granados

Combate 20: Estrellas I

April 13, 2018 - The Shrine, Los Angeles, California, United States

Main Event: José “Pochito” Alday vs. John “Sexi Mexi” Castaneda

Combate 21: Estrellas II

April 20, 2018 - Gimnasio Nuevo León, Monterrey, Mexico

Main Event: Érik "El Goyito" Pérez vs. DJ Fuentes 

Combate 22: México vs. USA

May 11, 2018 - McClellan Conference Center, Sacramento, California, United States

Main Event: Anthony “The Shark” Avila vs. José Luis Verdugo

Combate 23: México vs. El Mundo

May 18, 2018 - Auditorio Municipal, Tijuana, Baja C, Mexico

Main Event: Andres “The Bullet” Quintana vs. Marco Antonio “La Roca” Elpidio

SEASON 2

Combate 24: Alday vs. Lopez (Championship Fight)

September 14 - Celebrity Theater, Phoenix, Arizona, United States

Main Event: Jose "El Pochito" Alday vs. Gustavo Lopez

Combate 25: Road to Copa Combate

September 28, 2018 - Walter Pyramid, Long Beach, California, United States

Main Event: Andres Quintana vs. Eric Gonzalez

Combate 26: Mexico vs. USA

October 13, 2018 - Anselmo Valencia Amphitheater, Tucson, Arizona, United States

Main Event: Anthony Birchak vs. Adam Martinez

Combate 27: La Batalla de Guadalajara

October 26, 2018 - Nissan Gymnastics Complex, Guadalajara, Jalisco, Mexico

Main Event: Victor Hugo Madrigal vs. Cristian Quinonez 

Combate 28: Combate Monterrey

November 17, 2018 - Nuevo León Gymnasium, Monterrey, Nuevo León, Mexico

Main Event: Érik Pérez vs. Andres Ayala

Combate 29: Copa Combate

December 7, 2018 - Save Mart Center, Fresno, California, United States

Main Event: Andres Quintana vs. Alejandro Flores

Combate 30: Combate Baja

February 8, 2019 -  Auditorio del Estado, Mexicali, Baja California, Mexico

Main Event: Rafa Garcia vs. Edgar Escarrega 

Combate 31: Mexico vs. USA

February 22, 2019 -  Save Mart Center, Fresno, California, USA

Main Event: Daniel Rodriguez vs. Ivan Castillo  

Combate 32: Mexico vs. Spain

March 8, 2019 -  Arena Coliseo Guadalajara, Jalisco, Mexico

Main Event: Erick Gonzalez vs. Alejandro Martinez 

Combate 33: Alday vs. Lopez 2 (Championship Fight)

March 29, 2019 -  Casino del Sol, Tucson, Arizona, United States

Main Event: Jose Alday vs. Gustavo Lopez 

Combate 34: Combate Estrellas

April 12, 2019 -  Arena Jose Sulaiman, Monterrey, Nuevo León, Mexico

Main Event: Alejandro Flores vs. Levy Marroquin 

Combate 35: Combate Reinas

April 26, 2019 - Galen Center, Los Angeles, California, United States

Main Event: Melissa Martinez vs. Caroline Gallardo 

Combate 36: Combate Stockton

May 10, 2019 - Stockton Center, Stockton, California, United States

Main Event: Erick Sanchez vs. Alex Velasco 

Combate 37: Combate Peru

May 31, 2019 - Coliseo Manuel Bonilla, Miraflores, Peru

Main Event: Daniel Zellhuber vs. Geanfranco Cortez   

Combate 38: Combate Unbreakable

June 7, 2019 - Casino del Sol, Tucson, Arizona, United States

Main Event: Jose Alday vs. Juan Pablo Gonzalez

Combate 39: Combate Hidalgo

June 21, 2019 - State Farm Arena, Hidalgo, Texas, United States

Main Event: Ricky Palacios vs. Cooper Gibson   

Combate 40: Combate Fresno

August 2, 2019 - Save Mart Center, Fresno, California, United States 

Main Event: Reina Cordoba vs. Zoila Frausto     

Combate 41: Combate Lake Tahoe

August 24, 2019 - Lake Tahoe Outdoor Arena at Harvey's, Lake Tahoe, Nevada, United States

Main Event: Gustavo Lopez vs. Joey Ruquet   

Combate 42: Combate Chicago

September 6, 2019 - Cicero Stadium, Cicero, Illinois, Chicago

Main Event: David Argueta vs. Ronny Mendez   

Combate 43: Combate Mexicali

September 20, 2019 - Auditorio del Estado, Mexicali, Baja California, Mexico

Main Event: Rafa Garcia vs. Erick Gonzalez   

Combate 44: Combate Guadalajara

September 27, 2019 - Foro Sur, Guadalajara, Jalisco, Mexico

Main Event: Horacio Gutierrez vs. Chase Gibson   

Combate 45: Combate Tucson

October 11, 2019 - Casino del Sol, Tucson, Arizona, California 

Main Event: Joby Sanchez vs. Jose Alday   

Combate 46: Combate Monterrey 

May 31, 2019 - Dome Care, Monterrey, Nuevo Leon, Mexico 

Main Event: Alejandro Flores vs. Marco Elpidio   

Combate Tucson 

October 11, 2019 - Casino Del Sol, Tucson, Arizona, United States	

Main Event: Joby Sanchez vs. Jose Alday 

Combate Monterrey 

October 18, 2019 - Mexico Dome Care, Monterrey, Mexico

Main Event: Alejandro Flores vs. Marco Antonio Elpidio 

Combate Día de los Muertos: Dallas 

November 1, 2019	- Curtis Culwell Center, Garland, Texas, United States

Main event: Gilbert Urbina vs. Angelo Trevino 

Combate San Antonio 

November 8, 2019 - Freeman Coliseum, San Antonio, Texas, United States

Main Event: Nadine Mandiau vs. Melissa Cervantes

Combate Fresno 

November 22, 2019 - Save Mart Center, Fresno, California, United States

Main Event:  Salvador Becerra vs. Ignacio Bahamondes

Combate Americas: Tito vs. Alberto

December 7, 2019	- Payne Arena, Hidalgo, Texas, United States

Main Event: Tito Ortiz vs. Alberto El Patrón

Combate Americas: Stockton

December 13, 2019 - Stockton, California, United States

Main Event: Cameron Church vs. Alejandro Sanchez

Combate 53: Copa Combate

December 20, 2019 - Lima, Peru

Main Event: Humberto Bandenay vs. Erick Gonzalez

Combate 55: Garcia vs. Bandenay

February 21, 2020 - Auditorio del Estado, Mexicali, Baja California, Mexico

Main Event: Rafa Garcia vs. Humberto Bandenay

Combate Americas: Mexico vs. USA

February 28, 2020 - Save Mart Center, Fresno, California, United States

Main Event: Alejandro Martinez vs. Adrian Guzman

Copa Combate 

Copa Combate is an annual, one-night eight man tournament where the winner receives a prize of $100,000.  Each fighter represents their own country, in a quest to win the "Copa." The inaugural Copa took place during the 24th anniversary of the now legendary UFC 1, which was executive produced by Ultimate Fighting Championship (UFC) co-founder and Combate Americas CEO Campbell McLaren.

Copa Combate: Cancun

In the fall of 2017, Combate Americas and Telemundo Deportes announced a partnership to produce Cope Combate, a tournament that took place on November 11, 2017, in Cancun, Mexico.

The eight bantamweight (135 pounds) fighters were separated into four brackets with the top four fighters given seeded positions based on their worldwide rankings, while the opponents were determined based on a lottery ball drawing. The tournament's semifinal stage consisted of two bouts that pit the winners of the quarterfinal stage bouts in each tournament bracket against one another. The two winners from the semifinal faced each other.

Mexican fighter Levy Saúl “El Negro” Marroquín was the winner of Copa Combate, after stepping in for Ricky Palacios after he failed to make weight.

Original Bracket

 Mikey "El Terrible" Erosa (Puerto Rico) vs. Marcelo “Pitbull" Rojo (Argentina)
 Carlos "Lobo" Rivera (Mexico) vs. Ricky "El Gallero" Palacios (USA)
 John "Sexi Mexi" Castaneda (USA) vs. Kevin "El Frío" Moreyra (Peru)
 Marc "Lufo" Gómez (Spain) vs. Andrés "Doble A" Ayala (Colombia)

Alternate Bouts

 Levy Saúl “El Negro” Marroquín (México) vs. Alejandro “The Pitbull” Abomohor (Colombia)
 Felipe Vargas (Colombia) vs. Víctor Madrigal 

Ricky “El Gallero” Palacios and Andrés “Doble A Leal” Ayala were not able to make weight (the limit was 136 lbs). Therefore, Levy Saúl Marroquín took Palacios' place (now facing Rivera), while Alejandro Abomohor took Ayala's position (fighting against Gomez).

Quarter Finals

 Marcelo Rojo defeated Mike Erosa via Submission (armbar) at 2:20 of round 1
 Levy Saúl Marroquín defeated Carlos Rivera via Unanimous Decision (Score Cards: 10-9, 10-9, 10-8)
 John Castaneda defeated Kevin Moreyra via Submission (Rear-naked choke) at 4:55 of round 1. 
 Marc Gomez defeated Alejandro Abomohor via Unanimous Decision (Score Cards / Tarjetas: 10-9, 10-9, 10-8)

Semi-Finals Results

 Levy Saúl Marroquín defeated Marcelo Rojo via Submission (Guillotine Choke) at 1:56 of round 3. 
 John Castaneda defeated Marc Gomez via Unanimous Decision (Score Cards: 29-28, 29-28, 29-28) 

Final Result

 Levy Saúl Marroquín defeated John Castaneda via Unanimous Decision (Score Cards: 30-27, 29-28, 29-28)

Copa Combate: Fresno

Original Bracket

 Andres Quintana (USA) vs. Marlon Gonzalez (Peru)
 Alejandro Flores (Mexico) vs. John Bedoya (Colombia)
 Pablo Villaseca (Chile) vs. Daniel Requeijo (Spain)
 Bruno Cannetti (Argentina) vs. Joey Ruquet (Puerto Rico)

Alternate Bouts

 Gustavo Lopez (USA) vs. Vincente Marquez (Spain)
 Pablo Sabori (Mexico) vs. Michael Irizarry (Puerto Rico)

Quarter Finals

 Andres Quintana defeated Marlon Gonzalez via Unanimous Decision (Score Cards: 10-9, 10-9, 10-9)
 Alejandro Flores defeated John Bedoya via Submission (D'arce Choke) at 3:03 of Round 1 
 Pablo Villaseca defeated Daniel Requeijo vis Split Decision (Score Cards: 10-9, 10-9, 9-10) 
 Bruno Cannetti defeated Joey Ruquet via Technical Knockout at 1:32 of Round 1 
Semi-Finals Results 
 Andres Quintana defeated Bruno Cannetti via Technical Knockout at 2:05 of Round 1 
 Alejandro Flores defeated Pablo Villaseca via Unanimous Decision (Score Cards: 30-27, 30-27, 29-28 ) 

Final Result

 Andres Quintana defeated Alejandro Flores via Knockout at 2:49 of Round 1

Current World champions

Men

Women

World Championship history

Lightweight Championship 

155 lbs (70 kg)

Featherweight Championship 

145 lbs (66 kg)

Bantamweight Championship 

135 lbs (61 kg)

Women's Strawweight Championship 

115 lbs (52 kg)

Reception 

“Combate ESTRELLAS I” and “Combate ESTRELLAS II” marked the first-ever live Univision and Univision Deportes Network (UDN) televised Mixed Martial Arts (MMA) events, on Friday, April 13 and Friday, April 20, respectively.

“Combate ESTRELLAS I” delivered a total of 583,000 persons 2+, including 296,000 adults in the coveted 18-49 age group, on the Univision and Univision Deportes Network simulcast.  Combate Americas beat Bellator 197, which aired in primetime on the Paramount Network, making it the number 2 MMA promotion that week. In Mexico, the event delivered over 4 million live broadcast television viewers on Azteca 7. The Facebook LIVE stream of the “Combate ESTRELLAS I” preliminary bout card  delivered over 294,000 streams.

Airing exclusively on UDN in the midnight ET slot the following Friday, April 20, “Combate ESTRELLAS II” delivered another 200,000 total viewers, a 10 percent increase from the first installment of the two-part, “Combate ESTRELLAS” live event series. Of the total UDN viewers for “Combate ESTRELLAS II,” 67 percent were in the 18-49 age group. The Facebook LIVE stream of the “Combate ESTRELLAS II” preliminary bout card garnered over 630,000 streams, more than doubling the online audience from ESTRELLAS I.

Awards 
Combate Americas was the winner of the Imagen Award for “Best Reality or Variety Series,” making it the first fight TV program to win a major award.

Combate America won the 2014 Cable Fax Award for Best Show or Series Reality/Competition/Game Show.

See also
 List of current Combate Global fighters
 List of current mixed martial arts champions

References

External links
 Official website

Mixed martial arts organizations